Vladimirovka may refer to:
Vladimirovka, Oghuz, Azerbaijan
Vladimirovka, Quba, Azerbaijan
Vladimirovka, former name of Nizami, Sabirabad, Azerbaijan
Vladimirovka, Russia, name of several rural localities in Russia

See also
Vladimir (disambiguation)
Vladimirsky (disambiguation)
Vladimirovsky